Antônio Augusto Dunshee de Abranches, commonly known as Dunshee de Abranches (born October 25, 1936), is a former president of Clube de Regatas do Flamengo (a Brazilian sports club based in the Flamengo neighborhood, Zona Sul, Rio de Janeiro, best known for its professional football team which is the biggest in terms of fans).

Biography
Born in Rio de Janeiro, he was Clube de Regatas do Flamengo's president from 1981 to 1983. During his administration, Flamengo won the Intercontinental Cup, the Copa Libertadores and the Campeonato Carioca in 1981, and the Série A in 1982. Dunshee de Abranches resigned in 1983, after selling Zico to Italian club Udinese.

References

1936 births
Living people
CR Flamengo directors and chairmen
Brazilian people of Irish descent